Lindsay Jackson "Happy" Perry Sr. (March 30, 1896 – January 24, 1986) was an American football, basketball, and baseball coach.  He served as the head football coach at Elon University from 1946 to 1947, compiling a record of 8–11–1. He graduated from Elon in 1923, with a Bachelor of Arts degree. His hometown was Wingate, North Carolina.

Head coaching record

Football

References

1896 births
1986 deaths
Basketball coaches from North Carolina
Elon Phoenix baseball coaches
Elon Phoenix football coaches
Elon Phoenix men's basketball coaches
People from Ansonville, North Carolina